Imazu Station is the name of two train stations in Japan:

 Imazu Station (Hyōgo)
 Imazu Station (Ōita)